Conspiracy to impede or injure a federal officer is an American offense under 42 U.S.C 1985. This provision is more than 100 years old and has been infrequently used. It was used in the prosecution of Edward and Elaine Brown The law also allows civil suits for conspiring to prevent a federal officer from discharging his duties.

References

External links 

United States federal criminal legislation